Spodnja Ščavnica is a settlement in the upper Ščavnica Valley southwest of Gornja Radgona in northeastern Slovenia.

References

External links
Spodnja Ščavnica on Geopedia

Populated places in the Municipality of Gornja Radgona